The marine wildlife of Baa Atoll consists of marine species living in a circular archipelago in the Maldives, inside the administrative division of Baa Atoll, which is the southern part of Maalhosmadulu Atoll. Baa Atoll was named a biosphere reserve by UNESCO in 2011.

The whole is approximately 38 km by 46 km, covering a surface of 1,127 km2. However, the atoll shelters only 5.5 km2 of emerged land, consisting of sandy islands not higher than 3.19 m, and of which half do not exceed an area of 10 hectares. The administrative subdivision of Baa, shelters 11,910 inhabitants, distributed on 13 of the 75 islands, 8 other islands being island resorts; the capital is Eydhafushi.

The archipelago has been located inside the UNESCO Biosphere reserve since 2011. Its shallow waters, particularly rich in coral and fish as well as turtles and dolphins, madk a favored place for seaside and underwater tourism.

The ecosystem is characterized by a very high rate of coral cover, highly diverse and dominated by table, digitate and branched corals of the genus Acropora. The shallow waters of this atoll and its particular richness in corals and fish have made it a destination for underwater tourism. The presence of huge animals such as manta rays and whale sharks add spectacular encounters to the beauty of the place. Scientific studies suggest that the faunistic composition can vary greatly between neighbor atolls, especially in terms of benthic fauna.

All of the images illustrating this article, except for the satellite view, were taken in the waters of Baa Atoll.

General view

Marine mammals

Reptiles

Fish

Rays and sharks ("Chondrichthyes")

Rays

Sharks

Ray-finned fishes (Teleostei) 
 Elopomorpha ("eels")

Aulopiformes

Lophiiformes

Mugiliformes

Atheriniformes

Beloniformes

Beryciformes

Syngnathiformes

Scorpaeniformes (scorpionfish, stonefish…)

Perciformes

Groupers

Emperors (Lethrinidae)

Snappers (Lutjanidae)

Butterflyfish

Angelfish

Hawkfish

Clownfish and damselfish

Wrasses

Parrotfish 
Since 2020, all species of parrotfishes are strictly protected in Maldives.

Blennies

Gobies

Surgeonfish and unicorn fish

Pleuronectiformes

Tetraodontiformes

Ascidians

Echinoderms

Sea stars

Brittle stars

Crinoids

Sea urchins

Sea cucumbers

Molluscs

Gastropods (sea snails)

Order Neogastropoda

Other Caenogastropoda

Opisthobranchia (sea slugs) 
 Sea hares (Anaspidea, family Aplysiidae)
 Nudibranchs

 Other Opisthobranchia

Cephalopods

Bivalves (clams, oysters, cockles, mussels…)

Crustaceans

Crabs

Hermit crabs

Lobsters and associates

Shrimps

Other types of crustaceans

Marine worms

polychaete worms

Platyhelminthes (flat worms)

Other types of worms

Cnidarians

Corals

Hydrozoans

Sea anemones

Other hexacorallian corals

Sponges

See also 
 Coral reef
 Maldives

References

Sources

Main scientific reference

Bibliography 
 Jen Veron, Corals of the world, Townsville, Australie, ed. Mary Stafford-Smith, 2000.
 E. Lieske et R.F. Myers, Guide des poissons des récifs coralliens, Lausanne, Delachaux et Niestlé, 1994, 400 p..
  Rudie H. Kuiter, Photo guide to fishes of the Maldives, Apollo Bay, Atoll, 1998, 257 p..
 Neville Coleman, Marine life of the Maldives, Apollo Bay, Atoll, 2004, 257 p..

Databases 
 FishBase
 DORIS
 Marine Species Identification Portal

Taxonomic databases and references 

 World Register of Marine Species
 Catalog of Fishes
 ITIS
 Sea Life Base

Biota of the Maldives